Kalaoa is a census-designated place (CDP) in Hawaii County, Hawaii, United States. The population was 9,644 as of the 2010 census, up from 6,794 residents at the 2000 census.

Geography
Kalaoa is located on the west side of the island of Hawaii at  (19.722969, -156.004669). Kalaoa sits on the lower western slopes of the Hualalai volcano and extends west to the Pacific Ocean.

Demographics

2000 Census data

At the 2000 census there were 6,794 people, 2,402 households, and 1,724 families. The racial makup of the CDP was 49.34% White, 0.35% African American, 0.52% Native American, 13.39% Asian, 10.35% Pacific Islander, 0.78% from other races, and 25.27% from two or more races. Hispanic or Latino of any race were 5.95%.

Of the 2,402 households 34.6% had children under the age of 18 living with them, 57.8% were married couples living together, 9.7% had a female householder with no husband present, and 28.2% were non-families. 19.4% of households were one person and 3.7% were one person aged 65 or older.  The average household size was 2.83 and the average family size was 3.19.

The age distribution was 25.5% under the age of 18, 6.8% from 18 to 24, 29.5% from 25 to 44, 29.3% from 45 to 64, and 8.9% 65 or older.  The median age was 39 years. For every 100 females, there were 102.5 males.  For every 100 females age 18 and over, there were 101.2 males.

The median household income was $53,024 and the median family income  was $56,461. Males had a median income of $35,082 versus $27,130 for females. The per capita income was $24,179.  About 3.0% of families and 6.2% of the population were below the poverty line, including 7.2% of those under age 18 and 5.1% of those age 65 or over.

Economy
Mokulele Airlines, a small inter-island commuter airline, is headquartered in the CDP, on the grounds of Keahole at Kona Int'l Airport.

Transportation

Keahole at Kona International Airport is located in the lower Kalaoa CDP, and serves the western side of the Big Island, including Kailua-Kona, Holualoa, Keauhou, Captain Cook, Waikoloa, Waimea, and the Kohala Coast. The Kalaoa area is served by two major highways: the upper and lower routes of Hawaii Belt Road. The upper section is known as Mamalahoa Highway/Route 190, and the lower, more utilized coastal route, is known as Queen Ka'ahumanu Highway, but it is also known by its nickname as The Queen K/Route 19.

Points of interest
 Keahole Point
 Natural Energy Laboratory of Hawaii
 Kaloko-Honokohau National Historical Park
 Mount Hualalai

References

Census-designated places in Hawaii County, Hawaii
Populated places on Hawaii (island)
Populated coastal places in Hawaii